Adam Scott Collegiate and Vocational Institute and Intermediate School, established in 1960, is a high school and middle school in Peterborough, Ontario, Canada, and was named for Adam Scott, Peterborough's first settler. , 222 students were enrolled in its Intermediate School (grades seven and eight) and 796 students in the secondary school (grades nine to twelve). The school has an auto shop as well as a basic chemistry lab. It also has a newly renovated library and a courtyard.  

Adam Scott CVI is part of the Kawartha Pine Ridge District School Board and celebrated its 50th anniversary in the Fall of 2010.

Adam Scott CVI is named after Adam Scott, Peterborough, Ontario's first settler.

Athletics
Some of the sports Adam Scott Collegiate & Vocational Institute participates in include:

 Badminton
 Baseball
 Basketball
  Cross country
 Field hockey
  Football
 Golf
 Ice hockey
 Lacrosse
  Rowing 
 Rugby
 Soccer
 Track and field
  Ultimate frisbee
 Volleyball

Notable alumni
 Dean Del Mastro - Politician
  Mike Fisher - Ice hockey player
 Adam Gontier - Musician
 Neil Sanderson - Musician
 Barbara Mervin - Canadian National Rugby Player. https://en.m.wikipedia.org/wiki/Barbara_Mervin

See also
List of high schools in Ontario

References

External links
Official website
School page for the secondary level at the Kawartha Pine Ridge District School Board web site
School page for the intermediate level at the Kawartha Pine Ridge District School Board web site

High schools in Peterborough, Ontario
Elementary schools in Peterborough, Ontario
Educational institutions established in 1960
1960 establishments in Ontario